Eusapia matogrossensis is a species of beetle in the family Cerambycidae. It was described by Huedepohl, in 1988.

References

Hesperophanini
Beetles described in 1988